Jordon Banfield (born September 2, 1986) is an American baseball coach, who is the current head baseball of the Oakland Golden Grizzlies. He graduated from the University of Michigan.

Early life
Banfield attended Greenhills School in Ann Arbor, Michigan, where he was a member of the baseball and golf teams. He was a pitcher and third baseman, who was named second-team All-State Division IV in Michigan. He committed to play baseball for the Central Michigan Chippewas, but ended up attending the University of Michigan, where he studied sports management.

Coaching career
Banfield began coaching baseball as an assistant at Huron High School in Ann Arbor, before becoming an assistant at Pioneer High School. Banfield went on to coach the Ann Arbor Travelers program from 2008–2012. The team made multiple appearances at the Connie Mack World Series, won 22 total tournaments in five seasons and produced 20 NCAA Division I recruits, including MLB player James Bourque. Banfield then went on to coach at Illinois Springfield, Texas Rio Grande Valley, and Akron. On May 29, 2020, Banfield was named the head baseball coach of the Oakland Golden Grizzlies. 

Banfield’s second season at Oakland was by all measures the best in Division I program history. The team broke records for most regular season wins (29), total wins (31), highest Horizon League finish (2nd) and finished runner-up in the tournament.

Head coaching record

References

External links
Oakland Golden Grizzlies bio

Living people
1986 births
University of Michigan alumni
High school baseball coaches in the United States
UIS Prairie Stars baseball coaches
UT Rio Grande Valley Vaqueros baseball coaches
Akron Zips baseball coaches
Oakland Golden Grizzlies baseball coaches
Baseball coaches from Michigan